Columbus Drive is a north–south street in Chicago, Illinois which bisects Grant Park. It is 300 East in Chicago's street numbering system. Its south end is an interchange with Lake Shore Drive (US 41) at Soldier Field.  After intersecting Illinois Street, it becomes Fairbanks Court and continues to the north, terminating at Chicago Avenue.

Roadway
In the Illinois Center development, the main lanes of Columbus Drive are on the middle deck of a three-level structure. That level intersects with the middle levels of Randolph Street, Lake Street, South Water Street and Wacker Drive. All these intersecting streets also exist on the lower and upper levels, except for Lake, which is a pedestrian mall on the upper level; both of these levels go only from Randolph to Wacker. Level-transition ramps are connected directly to Columbus at the following points:
Southbound down-ramp and northbound up-ramp between the lower and middle levels, between Randolph and Lake; no access to Lake from the up-ramp, which merges just to the north of the middle level intersection
Westbound down-ramps and eastbound up-ramps in the middle of South Water between Columbus and Stetson Avenue, connecting lower and middle levels at Stetson (west end) to the middle and upper levels at Columbus (east end)
Westbound up-ramp from the service (lowest) level at Wacker to a point just west of Stetson, where it joins the middle level of Wacker (which then descends to become the lower deck of the subsequent two-level Wacker) 

The middle level of Columbus Drive crosses the Chicago River via the Columbus Avenue Bridge, a bascule structure built in 1982, and known by many locals as the Chicago kissing bridge. North of the river, it intersects the upper level of North Water Street and passes over that road's lower level before descending to ground level just before reaching Illinois Street.

History
Columbus originally only went south from Monroe Street, south of Illinois Center. In 1980, it was extended to Wacker, including the three-level portion, and it was built over the Chicago River in 1982, connecting to Fairbanks Court. In 1992 the upper level of North Water Street was built.

Intersections

See also

Multilevel streets in Chicago

References

External links

Streets in Chicago